Ian Alexander Coutts (born 1956) has been Anglican Bishop of Bunbury in Western Australia since 2018.

He was educated at the University of Warwick (BA, 1977), Jesus College, Oxford (MSc, 1980), King's College London and Charles Sturt University, Sydney (PhD, 2015).

References

1956 births
Living people
Alumni of the University of Warwick
Alumni of Jesus College, Oxford
Charles Sturt University alumni
Anglican bishops of Bunbury
21st-century Anglican bishops in Australia